Roque Raúl Alfaro  (born 15 August 1956 in Nogoyá, Entre Ríos) is an Argentine football manager and former player who played as a striker.

Playing career

Alfaro started his professional career with Newell's Old Boys in the mid 1970s. In 1981, he was signed by Panathinaikos FC in Greece, and he played under the greek surname Bistakis. He returned to South America later that year to play for América de Cali in Colombia where he won two league championships.

In 1983, he returned to Argentina to play for River Plate, he was part of the championship winning team of 1895-1986 and helped the team to win their first ever Copa Libertadores in 1986. The club also won the less prestigious Copa Interamericana during his time at the club.

He was selected to play for Argentina in the Copa América 1987. In 1987, he returned to Newell's Old Boys where he won another league title in 1987-1988. Towards the end of his playing career he had a spell in Chile playing for O'Higgins until his retirement in 1992.

Managerial career

Alfaro has had spells as manager of Newell's Old Boys, Platense, Independiente Rivadavia San Martín de San Juan and Talleres de Perico in Argentina. Outside Argentina he has taken charge of O'Higgins in Chile, The Strongest in Bolivia, Libertad in Paraguay and Olmedo in Ecuador where he led the team to promotion by winning the Ecuadorian Serie B in 2003.

Honours
 América de Cali
 Colombian league: 1982, 1983

 River Plate
 Primera División Argentina: 1985–86
 Copa Libertadores: 1986
 Copa Intercontinental: 1986
 Copa Interamericana: 1986

 Newell's Old Boys
 Primera División Argentina: 1987–88

References

External links

  Vende Humo profile

1956 births
Living people
Sportspeople from Entre Ríos Province
Argentine footballers
Argentina international footballers
1987 Copa América players
Association football forwards
Newell's Old Boys footballers
Panathinaikos F.C. players
América de Cali footballers
Club Atlético River Plate footballers
Copa Libertadores-winning players
O'Higgins F.C. footballers
Expatriate footballers in Chile
Expatriate footballers in Colombia
Expatriate footballers in Greece
Argentine football managers
Newell's Old Boys managers
Club Atlético Platense managers
San Martín de San Juan managers
The Strongest managers
Independiente Rivadavia managers
Juventud Antoniana managers
Categoría Primera A players
Argentine Primera División players
Argentine expatriate footballers
Expatriate football managers in Chile
Argentine expatriate sportspeople in Greece
C.S.D. Macará managers
C.D. Olmedo managers
Alianza Atlético managers